The spotted kestrel (Falco moluccensis) is also known as the Moluccan kestrel.

Distribution and habitat
Spread through Wallacea and Java, the spotted kestrel inhabits grasslands with scattered trees, lightly wooded cultivation, and the edges of primary and tall secondary forest.  Along logging roads, it occasionally penetrates forests, and sometimes inhabits clearings within forested areas.  It has also been known to live in areas of human habitation.

Behavior
The spotted kestrel displays similar habits to that of the common kestrel.

Diet
The spotted kestrel feeds primarily on small mammals, birds, mostly waterfowl and doves, lizards, and insects.

Nesting
Displaying similar nesting habits to other kestrels, the spotted kestrel can be found occupying man-made structures, abandoned nests, and cliff sides. In Indonesia, nests were found in a variety of locations, including the peaked roofs of traditional houses or in the crowns of palm trees. Nests are usually occupied from March through September or October during mating season.

Voice
The spotted kestrel has a call described as common, a keek, keek, keek, similar to other kestrels. While in flight, they tend to use a more scream-like call, rrrrit, rrrrit, rrrrit.

See also

Falcon

References

Further reading

External links
BeautyOfBirds, formerly Avian Web
Planet of Birds
Falco moluccensis-Fact Sheet (birdlife.org)
Species account at Global Raptor Information Network

Birds described in 1850
Falco (genus)
Taxa named by Charles Lucien Bonaparte